Wild Run: The Legend is a 2016 Canadian fantasy film directed by Jean-Philippe Duval and starring Caroline Dhavernas, Francis Ducharme and François Papineau. The film's screenplay is written by Guillaume Vigneault, based on the French Canadian legend of Chasse-galerie.

Plot
On New Year's Eve, 1863, Theodore Gilbert meets Jack Murphy, a suave man, while Theodore fears his pregnant wife may die during delivery. Murphy offers a solution, and Theodore dies. In 1888 in L'Ascension, Quebec, lumberjack Jos Lebel is in a romantic relationship with Theodore's grown daughter Liza Gilbert. Jos and a group of lumberjacks then set out to work in the Quebec wilderness. The group is eager to spend the holiday with their loved ones, when they meet Murphy, who is really the Devil. The men make a Faustian deal with Murphy to return home, employing a flying canoe.

Cast 
Caroline Dhavernas as Liza Gilbert
Francis Ducharme as Joe Lebel
François Papineau as Jack Murphy
Vincent-Guillaume Otis as Romain Boisjoli
Fabien Cloutier as Michael McDuff

Production

The legend of Chasse-galerie was an oral tradition in Quebec for years before Honoré Beaugrand wrote a book on the subject, with Guillaume Vigneault's screenplay marking the first feature film adaptation. Jean-Philippe Duval became the director after agreeing to make a third film, following his Matroni and Me (Matroni et moi) and Through the Mist (Dédé, à travers les brumes). The budget was $7 million.

With a fascination in history, Duval approached the production from a historically realistic perspective, encouraged by the success of the 2015 film The Revenant. Challenges arose in post-production, one of the reasons the planned December 2015 release was cancelled.

Reception
The film was released in Quebec on 26 February 2016. It debuted fourth at the Quebec box office, grossing $140,289 in its first weekend. For Halloween 2016, Alliance Francaise screened Wild Run: The Legend in Toronto. Les Films Séville also released it on DVD on 7 June 2016.

Reviews were generally positive. Brendan Kelly, writing for The Montreal Gazette, gave it two and a half stars, comparing the realism to the TV series Les Pays d'en haut, but said that the depiction of the Devil subtracted from the seriousness. In La Presse,   awarded it three and a half stars, saying the realism had great impact and made the winter setting feel real, and crediting Dhavernas and Ducharme for chemistry. Quebec fantasy writer Bryan Perro championed the belated adaptation, saying it was important for contemporary Quebec to reconnect with its heritage. Le Devoir'''s André Lavoie praised the film's visuals, aside from the fairy tale segments. Isabelle Laramée gave it three stars in Journal Metro'', citing the artistic direction and cinematography.

Accolades

References

External links
Chasse-Galerie: La Légende at the Internet Movie Database

2016 films
2016 fantasy films
Canadian Christmas films
Canadian fantasy films
Films set in Quebec
Films set in the 19th century
2010s French-language films
Quebec films
The Devil in film
Films directed by Jean-Philippe Duval
French-language Canadian films
2010s Canadian films